George Webber Barlow (June 15, 1929 – July 14, 2007) was an American ichthyologist, an ethologist (animal behaviorist) and evolutionary biologist specializing in fish. Barlow was a well-known expert on cichlid fishes.

Tribute
Apistogramma barlowi U. Römer, & I. J. Hahn, 2008, a dwarf cichlid was named in Barlow's honor.

See also
:Category:Taxa named by George W. Barlow

References

1929 births
2007 deaths
American ichthyologists
20th-century American zoologists